The Maidu Regional Park is located in Roseville, California. This 152-acre park has a small museum and historic site. The grounds also consist of the Maidu Community Center, the Maidu Branch Library, and Veterns Memorial Rose Garden. Other features include a four-diamond softball complex, a five-field soccer complex, a batting cage, a skate park, a full basketball court, picnic areas and play equipment, and a bicycle and pedestrian path through the wooded area of the park where multiple artifacts from the Maidu Native American tribe have been found.

External links
 http://www.roseville.ca.us/parks/parks_n_facilities/parks_in_roseville/maidu.asp

Roseville, California
Parks in Placer County, California